Antispila distyliella is a moth of the family Heliozelidae. It is found on the Ryukyu Islands in Japan.

The forewings are dark fuscous with purple reflections and two silver-white dorsal spots with metallic reflections. The hindwings are pale fuscous with metallic reflections. Adults emerge from early to mid June.

The larvae feed on Distylium racemosum. They mine into a blade of the host plant. Initially, the mine has the form of a tortuous linear mine on the palisade layer. Later, it becomes a full-depth blotch mine. Full-grown larvae make a case using epidermal layers by cutting the leaf. They seal the case and drop to the ground. Pupation takes place in the case. Larvae can be found from late March to early April.

Etymology
The specific epithet is derived from the generic name of the host plant, D. racemosum.

References

Moths described in 2006
Endemic fauna of Japan
Heliozelidae
Moths of Japan